Marmion is a historic home located near Comorn, King George County, Virginia. The original section was built about 1670 by William Fitzhugh (1651-1701), progenitor of the Fitzhugh family in Virginia. It took its present form after 1790 or 1800.  The house is a frame, two-story house with a clipped gable roof and two interior end chimneys with exposed chimney shafts. Also on the property are the contributing smokehouse, dairy, kitchen, and office.

The ornately painted decorative paneling from the house's distinctive seven-sided drawing room was sold to The Metropolitan Museum of Art in 1916.

It was listed on the National Register of Historic Places in 1970.

References

External links
Marmion, State Route 649 vicinity, Comorn, King George County, VA: 30 photos and 25 measured drawings at Historic American Buildings Survey

Historic American Buildings Survey in Virginia
Houses on the National Register of Historic Places in Virginia
Houses completed in 1670
Houses in King George County, Virginia
National Register of Historic Places in King George County, Virginia
1670 establishments in Virginia
Fitzhugh family residences